Sedam Assembly seat is one of 224 assembly constituencies in Karnataka State, in India. It is part of Gulbarga (Lok Sabha constituency).

Assembly members

Hyderabad State (Tandur Serum Constituency)
 1951: J. K. Praneshchari, Indian National Congress

Mysore State
 1957 (Seat-1): Jamadanda Papiah Sarwesh, Independent
 1957 (Seat-2): Mallappa Lingappa, Indian National Congress
 1962: Jamadanda Papiah Sarwesh, Indian National Congress
 1967: Jamadanda Papiah Sarwesh, Swatantra Party
 1972: Jamadanda Papiah Sarwesh, Indian National Congress

Karnataka State
 1978:	Sher Khan, Indian National Congress (Indira)
 1983:	Nagareddy Patil Sedam, Bharatiya Janata Party
 1985:	Chandershekhar Reddy Madna, Independent
 1989:	Basavanathareddy Motakpalli, Indian National Congress
 1994:	Chandershekhar Reddy Madna, Janata Dal
 1999:	Basavanathareddy Motakpalli, Indian National Congress
 2004:	Sharan Prakash Patil, Indian National Congress
 2008:	Sharan Prakash Patil, Indian National Congress
 2013:	Sharan Prakash Patil, Indian National Congress
 2018: Rajkumar Patil, Bharatiya Janata Party

See also
List of constituencies of the Karnataka Legislative Assembly

References

Assembly constituencies of Karnataka
Kalaburagi district